James O'Reilly,  (September 16, 1823 – May 15, 1875) was a Canadian lawyer and politician who represented Renfrew South in the House of Commons of Canada from 1872 to 1874.

He was born in Westport, County Mayo, Ireland, the son of Peter O'Reilly, and came to Upper Canada in 1832 with his father. O'Reilly studied law with C. O. Benson in Belleville and later with John Willoughby Crawford.

He was called to the Ontario bar in 1847 and set up practice in Kingston. In 1850, he married Mary Jane Redmond. He was named a Queen's Counsel in 1864 and was later called to the Quebec bar. O'Reilly prosecuted Patrick James Whelan who was convicted for the assassination of D'Arcy McGee and hanged.

He served on Kingston City Council as a municipal councillor from 1850 to 1855, was the city's Recorder from 1864 to 1869 and also was a director of the Kingston and Pembroke Railway. O'Reilly commanded a company of volunteer militia, reaching the rank of major. He died in Kingston, aged 51.

External links 
Biography at the Dictionary of Canadian Biography Online
 
The Canadian parliamentary companion, HJ Morgan (1873)

1823 births
1875 deaths
19th-century Irish people
Conservative Party of Canada (1867–1942) MPs
Irish emigrants to pre-Confederation Ontario
Irish expatriates in Canada
Kingston, Ontario city councillors
Members of the House of Commons of Canada from Ontario
Politicians from Belleville, Ontario
Politicians from County Mayo
Canadian King's Counsel